DWOK (97.5 FM), on-air as 97.5 OK FM, is a radio station owned and operated by Subic Broadcasting Corporation in the Philippines. Its studio is located at Admiral Royale Bldg., 17 St. cor. Anonas St., Brgy. West Bajac-Bajac, Olongapo, and its transmitter is located at Upper Kalakhan, Olongapo.

References

External links

Radio stations in Olongapo
Radio stations established in 1996